Senator Yee may refer to:

Kimberly Yee (born 1974), Arizona State Senate
Leland Yee (born 1948), California State Senate